Abdolabad (also Romanized as ‘Abdolābād) is a village in Pain Jovin Rural District, Helali District, Joghatai County, Razavi Khorasan Province, Iran. At the 2006 census, its population was 369, in 91 families. It is located on the Northeastern side of the country.

See also 

 List of cities, towns and villages in Razavi Khorasan Province

References 

Populated places in Joghatai County